Shortly after American singer Warren Zevon was diagnosed with terminal lung cancer, he made his final public appearance on the late-night talk show Late Show with David Letterman on October 30, 2002. Zevon, who regularly appeared on the show over the preceding decade, was unusually given the majority of the episode to talk with Letterman and perform three songs. It is known for the humor that Zevon used throughout the interview, and for his quip that the terminal diagnosis was a reminder to "enjoy every sandwich".

Background 
David Letterman, a comedian who began the late-night NBC Late Night franchise in 1982, was a major fan of Zevon's work. Letterman would later tell The Ringer reporter Alan Siegel that he began following Zevon in 1981 because he was "crazy and fascinating". Letterman often brought Zevon onto his subsequent CBS Late Show with David Letterman through the 1990s despite his lack of commercial success during that time. He would even serve as the show's substitute band leader during Paul Shaffer's absences. Zevon would return the favor by giving Letterman a bit part on Zevon's album My Ride's Here. Of the relationship between Letterman and Zevon, newspaper columnist Terry Lawson would later write:

In August 2002, a few months ahead of the release of Genius: The Best of Warren Zevon, Zevon received a terminal diagnosis of lung cancer (pleural mesothelioma). He revealed his fate to the public in the following month. To promote the album, Zevon intended to visit the Late Show once again as a guest. Knowing that this would likely be his final appearance on the show, the Late Shows producers instead proposed devoting an entire episode to Zevon. Letterman immediately endorsed the idea.

Episode 
Aside from a traditional stand-up monologue and the recurring Top Ten List bit, the Late Shows episode on October 30, 2002, was entirely devoted to Zevon. Audience members were given special instructions to not react with "sympathy sound" like "awwwwww" if they heard sad news, while Zevon pushed Letterman to prioritize humor over awkward questions.

Letterman introduced the singer to his audience by speaking at length about Zevon, his influence on Letterman, and his history with the show, with occasional interjections from Late Show band leader Paul Shaffer.

After Zevon came to the stage, he parried questions with humor throughout the interview. Letterman opened the conversation with a dry question about Zevon's health: "a couple of months ago we all learned that your life has changed radically, hasn't it?" Zevon responded: "you mean you heard about the flu?" At other points, Zevon told Letterman:

That he had made a "tactical error" in not visiting a doctor for about two decades ("it was one of those phobias that really didn't pay off," he added)
That he should not be "fooled by cosmetics" when it came to his healthy appearance

The conversation had turned more serious when Letterman's question about the differences in recording before and after his cancer diagnosis prompted Zevon to give what one pop culture outlet later called "his most famous piece of advice": "You're reminded to enjoy every sandwich and every minute playing with the guys, and being with the kids." 

This "iconic" line, as The Forward called it, stuck with Letterman. Months after the episode aired, he told a reporter from The New York Times:

Zevon closed the episode by performing three songs taken from across his career:

 "Mutineer", the title track off his 1995 album
 "Genius", from his 2002 album My Ride's Here; it was also used as the title for the greatest hits album that Zevon was ostensibly promoting that night
 "Roland the Headless Thompson Gunner", from his 1978 album Excitable Boy

After the final note in "Roland the Headless Thompson Gunner", Letterman strolled over to Zevon, shook his hand, and told him to "enjoy every sandwich". Letterman would later state that he merely "repeat[ed] what seemed perfect"; the moment would be Zevon's final public appearance.

When the cameras stopped rolling, Letterman made what was for him an unusual decision to visit his guest's dressing room. Zevon surprised the host by gifting his guitar, telling Letterman to "take good care of this for me"; the request caused Letterman to immediately start crying.

Legacy 
Zevon's Late Show episode has garnered spots on several "best of" lists over the years. Two months after the show aired, Rolling Stones David Fricke ranked his performance of "Roland the Headless Thompson Gunner" third in their list of top music moments in the year. Fricke wrote that Zevon had "put everything he had into the song" after his "moving" conversation with Letterman. The same outlet ranked the episode as one of the best late-night TV moments from 2002–2013, and separately at number five on a list of "most profound moments" in the Late Show with David Lettermans history. Salon called it the "most heartbreaking" Late Show to have aired during Letterman's tenure.

In a longer retrospective, Uncut magazine said that the interview gave "the impression [that Zevon is] wise-cracking his way to the grave". Zevon's son added that his performance "was the role he was preparing to play all his life … it gave him the chance to be like one of his tough-guy heroes" despite the toll of his medications and mental health. William Breitbart, a psychiatrist and Zevon fan, would later write an editorial about the lessons people could learn from the musician's response to his impending death:

Zevon died on September 3, 2003, outliving his original prognosis by ten months. "Enjoy every sandwich" was later used for a posthumous Zevon compilation album. The quote has also been widely referenced in a variety of contexts, including people facing their own cancer diagnoses and when other celebrities deal with "dying in public", as Politico Magazine has put it.

References

External links 
 

2002 American television episodes
2002 in American music
Interviews
Late Show with David Letterman
Lung cancer
October 2002 events in the United States
Television episodes about cancer
Late Show with David Letterman in 2002